The Osunitas Stakes is an American Thoroughbred horse race held annually during the third week of July at Del Mar Racetrack in Del Mar, California. Open to fillies and mares age three and older, it is raced on turf over a distance of a mile and one sixteenth.

Historical notes
Hall of Fame inductee Bill Shoemaker, whose four wins in the Osunitas Handicap is the most for any jockey, earned his first ever win as a trainer when Baldomero won this event for him in 1990.

Records
Speed  record: (at current  miles)
 1:40.30 - Meydan Princess (2009)

Most wins:
 No horse has ever won this race more than once.

Most wins by a jockey:
 4 - Bill Shoemaker (1970, 1974, 1978, 1984)

Most wins by a trainer:
 6 - Ron McAnally (1965, 1981, 1986, 1993, 2004, 2008)

Winners

 2021 - Ippodamia's Girl (1:35.30)
 2013 - CLOSING RANGE (1:41.44)
 2012 - BROKEN DREAMS (1:41.71	
 2011 - ANDINA (1:42.07)	 
 2010 - LILLY FA POOTZ	(1:42.27)
 2009 - MEYDAN PRINCESS (1:40.30)
 2008 - ZARDANA (1:42.28)	 
 2007 - KRIS SIS (1:41.75)	 
 2006 - POLYFIRST (1:40.46)
 2005 - HEALTHY ADDICTION (1:40.73)
 2004 - VOZ DE COLEGIALA (1:41.15)	 
 2003 - ARABIC SONG (1:40.61)
 2002 - DYNAS CLUB (1:42.80)	 
 2001 - PAGA (1:41.06)
 2000 - SMOOTH PLAYER	(1:42.60)	 
 1999 - QUE BELLE (1:41.60)	 
 1998 - TUZLA (1:41.00)
 1997 - AURIETTE (1:42.60)	 
 1996 - REAL CONNECTION (1:42.63)
 1995 - MARINA PARK (1:42.60)	 
 1994 - Gold Splash (1:41.20)	 
 1993 - POTRIDEE (1:41.80)	 
 1992 - VISIBLE GOLD (1:41.60)	 
 1991 - KOSTROMA (1:41.20)
 1990 - BALDOMERO (1:42.00) (Bill Shoemaker's first win as a trainer)
 1989 - NIKISHKA (1:42.80)	 
 1988 - GRIEFNAGGREVATION (1:42.20) (1st Division)
 1988 - CHORITZO (1:41.40) (2nd Division)	 
 1987 - SHORT SLEEVES (1:42.60) (1st Division)
 1987 - MISS ALTO (1:44.00) (2nd Division) 
 1986 - LOUCOUM (1:42.60) (1st Division)
 1986 - FLYING GIRL (1:42.20) (2nd Division)
 1985 - CLOUDS DAUGHTER (1:43.60)	 
 1984 - READY FOR LUCK	(1st Division)
 1984 - SALT SPRING (2nd Division)
 1983 - NIGHT FIRE (1:43.60)	 
 1982 - AFLICKER  	 	 	 
 1981 - BERRY BUSH (1st Division)
 1981 - ADUANA (2nd Division)
 1980 - PETRONS LOVE		 	 	 	 
 1979 - PRINCESS TOBY		 	 	 	 
 1978 - FACT	 	 	 	 
 1977 - GRANJA SUENO		 	 	 	 
 1976 - SWEET ROBBERY		 	 	 	 
 1975 - MAMA KALI (Turf)
 1974 - KAMADORA (Turf, 1st Division)
 1974 - READY WIT (2nd Division)
 1973 - CUTTY (1st Division)
 1973 - DADDY'S DATSUN (2nd Division)	 	 	 
 1972 - FUNNY FUNNY ACHE (1st Division)
 1972 - OUR MADAM LUCKY
 1971 - ANCIENT SILK (1st Division)
 1971 - HAIL THE GREY (2nd Division)
 1970 - QUEEN JANINE (1:43.00)	 
 1969 - MISS LARKSVILLE (1st Division)
 1969 - HULA BEND (2nd Division)
 1968 - CIPHER	(1st Division)
 1968 - GREY'S CRICKET (2nd Division)
 1967 - TALLEETA	 	 
 1966 - WINDY KATE (1st Division)
 1966 - ALIS THEME (2nd Division)
 1965 - UNDENIABLE (1st Division)
 1965 - POONA QUEEN (2nd Division)
 1964 - KHAL IRELAND (1st Division)
 1963 - SABINA LOUISE (1st Division)
 1963 - MARY MEL (2nd Division)
 1962 - BIB N TUK	 	 	 	 
 1961 - Race Not Run
 1951 - Race Not Run
 1950 - HOLLER	(1:11.00) (6 furlongs)	 
 1945 - COPPER JADE (INAUGURAL RUNNING)

References

Del Mar Racetrack
Horse races in California
Mile category horse races for fillies and mares
Restricted stakes races in the United States
Turf races in the United States
Recurring sporting events established in 1945